Oh Teacher is an animated cartoon directed by Walt Disney, starring Oswald the Lucky Rabbit, and distributed by Universal Pictures. The film was reissued in 1932 by Walter Lantz Productions with added music and sound effects, and is the only known version to survive. The original version entered the public domain on January 1, 2023.

Plot
Oswald rides to his girlfriend's house on a bicycle. On the way, he asks a daisy if she loves him in the standard "She loves me/She loves me not" way.

A cat then steals Oswald's bike and his girlfriend. Oswald, ready to bludgeon the cat with a brick, patiently waits. The cat finds him and accidentally knocks himself out with the brick. Oswald pretends to have beaten him up, and gets back his girlfriend.

Home media
The short was released on December 11, 2007, on Walt Disney Treasures: The Adventures of Oswald the Lucky Rabbit.

References

External links
Oh Teacher at IMDB

1927 films
1927 animated films
American black-and-white films
1920s Disney animated short films
American silent short films
Oswald the Lucky Rabbit cartoons
Films directed by Walt Disney
Universal Pictures short films
Universal Pictures animated short films
Animated films about cats
Animated films without speech
Films about theft
1920s American films
Silent American comedy films
Public domain